Tetradactylus is a genus of lizards in the family Gerrhosauridae. The genus is endemic to Africa.

Species
The genus Tetradactylus contains the following species which are recognized as being valid.
Tetradactylus africanus  – African long-tailed seps 
Tetradactylus breyeri  – Breyer's long-tailed seps, vulnerable (VU)
Tetradactylus eastwoodae  – Eastwood's long-tailed seps, extinct (EX)
Tetradactylus ellenbergeri  – Ellenberger's long-tailed seps
Tetradactylus fitzsimonsi  – Fitzsimons's long-tailed seps
Tetradactylus seps  – short-legged seps 
Tetradactylus tetradactylus  – long-toed seps
Tetradactylus udzungwensis  – Udzungwa long-tailed seps

Nota bene: A binomial authority in parentheses indicates that the species was originally named in a genus other than Tetradactylus.

References

Further reading
Berger-Dell'Mour HAE (1983). "Der Übergang von Echse zu Schleiche in der Gattung Tetradactylus, Merrem [=The Transition from Lizard to Legless Lizard in the Genus Tetradactylus, Merrem]". Zoologische Jahrbücher. Abteilung für Anatomie und Ontogenie der Tiere 110: 1–152. (in German). 
Boulenger GA (1887). Catalogue of the Lizards in the British Museum (Natural History). Second Edition. Volume III. ... Gerrhosauridæ ... London: Trustees of the British Museum (Natural History). (Taylor and Francis, printers). xii + 575 pp. + Plates I-XL. (Genus Tetradactylus, p. 124).
Branch, Bill (2004). Field Guide to Snakes and other Reptiles of Southern Africa. Third Revised edition, Second impression. Sanibel Island, Florida: Ralph Curtis Books. 399 pp. . (Genus Tetradactylus, pp. 181–182).
Merrem B (1820). Versuch eines Systems der Amphibien: Tentamen Systematis Amphibiorum. Marburg: J.C. Krieger. xv + 191 pp. + one plate. (Tetradactylus, new genus, p. 75). (in German and Latin).

 
Gerrhosauridae
Lizard genera
Taxa named by Blasius Merrem